= Fountain Fresh International =

American drink dispenser company

Fountain Fresh
- Industry: Soft drinks
- Founder: Daniel G. Coborn
- Fate: Defunct
- Headquarters: Salt Lake City, Utah
- Products: Soft drink and water dispensers

Fountain Fresh International is a defunct United States company that operated soft drink and water dispensers at retail locations. Based in Salt Lake City, Utah, Fountain Fresh developed and marketed in-store, self-serve soft drink and pure drinking water beverage centers in the mid-1990s.

The original value proposition was for consumers to enjoy low-priced beverages by washing and refilling reusable soft-drink bottles in the Fountain Fresh dispenser. The concept was rolled out in several retail locations throughout the United States, including a large number of Wal-Mart stores.

The stations proved messy, confusing, and difficult to operate, and few consumers saw the value of saving a few cents on beverages by using the units. The company enjoyed a brief flurry of interest in the mid-1990s, but by the late 1990s, was essentially out of business.

The company has since become an object lesson in understanding user needs before launching a major product line, and has been covered by such media outlets as NPR.
